General elections were held in Punjab on 25 July 2018 to elect the 141 members of the 15th National Assembly from Punjab. The Pakistan Tehreek-e-Insaf (PTI) emerged victorious with 67 seats, followed by the Pakistan Muslim League (N) (PML(N)) with 64 seats. The PTI also won 16 of 33 reserved seats while the PML(N) won 15.

Background 
In the 2013 elections, the PML(N) emerged as the largest party in Punjab, achieving a landslide victory with 116 of 148 seats. The PTI, a relatively newer party, emerged as the second largest party with 8 seats. On the other hand, the Pakistan People’s Party (PPP) and Pakistan Muslim League (Q) (PML(Q)), both of which had large presences in the province after the 2008 elections, were both reduced to just 2 seats each.

Prior to these elections, the PTI and PML(Q) made a seat adjustment agreement between them on four seats of the National Assembly. These were NA-65 (Chakwal-II), NA-68 (Gujrat-I), NA-69 (Gujrat-II) and NA-172 (Bahawalpur-III).

Results

References 

2022 elections in Pakistan